The Roman Catholic Metropolitan Archdiocese of Chongqing (Chungking) is a Latin Metropolitan archdiocese located in southwestern PR China, yet still depends on the missionary Roman Congregation for the Evangelization of Peoples.

Its archiepiscopal see in the Cathedral of St. Joseph, in provincial-level city of Chongqing. The archdiocese has been vacant without an Apostolic administrator since 2003.

Statistics and extent 
It borders on the Diocese of Suifu 敘府 (its suffragan), Diocese of Shunqing 順慶, Diocese of Wanxian 萬縣 (its suffragan), Diocese of Shinan 施南, Diocese of Yuanling 沅陵, Apostolic Prefecture of Shiqian 石阡 and Metropolitan Archdiocese of Guiyang 貴陽.

In 1950, it pastorally served 37,608 Catholic (.3%) on 135,187 Square Miles in 42 parishes with 85 diocesan priests and 120 religious (only 6 male).

Ecclesiastical province 
Its Suffragan sees are : 
 Roman Catholic Diocese of Chengdu (成都)
 Roman Catholic Diocese of Jiading (嘉定)
 Roman Catholic Diocese of Kangding (康定)
 Roman Catholic Diocese of Ningyuan (甯遠)
 Roman Catholic Diocese of Shunqing (順慶)
 Roman Catholic Diocese of Suifu (敘府)
 Roman Catholic Diocese of Wanxian (萬縣), its daughter

History 

 Established on 2 April 1856 as Apostolic Vicariate of Southeastern Szechwan, renamed on 24 January 1860 as Apostolic Vicariate of Eastern Szechwan, on territory split off from the Apostolic Vicariate of Szechwan (Sichuan), separating it from North-western Szechwan and its first name was South-eastern Szechwan. There were nine European and ten native priests, the mission being confided to the Society of the Foreign Missions of Paris. The Right Rev. Mgr Desflèches (1844–87), Titular bishop of Sinita, was elected first Apostolic vicar. Missionaries and Christians were subject to imperial persecutions, but after the Franco-Chinese War of 1860, they obtained entire freedom to preach. In 1860 the mission was divided into two Apostolic vicariates: Eastern - and Southern Szechwan. The missionaries obtained from Chinese officials a piece of ground in the city of Chongqing (Chungking), as compensation for the losses undergone by the mission. New persecutions broke out: at Yu-yang Father Eyraud was put in jail, Fathers Mabileau and Rigaud were murdered; at Kien-Kiang Fathers Hue and Tay were killed in 1873; on 8 March 1876, the settlements of the Christians were pillaged at Kiang-pe. Father Coupat, elected coadjutor in 1882, in 1888 succeeded Bishop Desflèches, who was 'promoted' Titular Archbishop of Claudiopolis in Honoriade. In 1886 the buildings of the mission at Chongqing were pillaged and destroyed, the bishop and missionaries had to retire into the Chinese tribunal. In 1891 the Right Rev. Mgr Chouvellon, titular Bishop of Dausara, succeeded Bishop Coupat. In 1898 Fr. Fleury was captured by Yu-man-tse and held prisoner for months.
 Renamed on 3 December 1924 after its see as Apostolic Vicariate of Chongqing (Chungking;).
 Lost territory on 2 August 1929 to establish the then Apostolic Vicariate of Wanxian (萬縣), now its suffragan
 Promoted on 11 April 1946 as Metropolitan Archdiocese of Chongqing.

Episcopal ordinaries 
(all Roman rite, so far members of a Latin missionary congregation)

Apostolic Vicars of Eastern Szechwan 四川東境  
 Eugène-Jean-Claude-Joseph Desflèches, Society of the Foreign Missions of Paris (M.E.P.) (born France) (2 April 1856 – retired 20 February 1883); previously Titular Bishop of Sinita (1842.05.29 – 1883.02.20) as Coadjutor Apostolic Vicar of Szechwan 四川 (China) (1844 – 1856.04.02); emeritate as Titular Archbishop of Claudiopolis (in Honoriade) (1883.02.20 – death 1887.11.07).
 Eugène-Paul Coupat, M.E.P. (born France) (20 February 1883 – death 26 January 1890), succeeding as former Coadjutor Vicar Apostolic of Eastern Szechwan 四川東境 (China) (1882.08.28 – 1883.02.20) and Titular Bishop of Thagaste (1882.08.28 – 1890.01.26)
 Father Laurent Blettery, M.E.P. (born France) (2 September 1890 – 17 August 1891 not possessed), Titular Bishop of Zela (1890.09.02 – 1891.08.17 not possessed); died 1898
 Célestin-Félix-Joseph Chouvellon, M.E.P. (born France) (25 September 1891 – death 11 May 1924), Titular Bishop of Dausara (1891.09.25 – 1924.05.11)

Apostolic Vicar of Chongqing 重慶  
 Louis-Gabriel-Xavier Jantzen, M.E.P. (last incumbent born in France)  (16 February 1925 – 11 April 1946 see below), Titular Bishop of Tremithus (1926.02.16 – 1946.04.11)

Metropolitan Archbishops of Chongqing 重慶 
 Louis-Gabriel-Xavier Jantzen, M.E.P. (see above 11 April 1946 – retired 24 October 1950), emeritate as Titular Archbishop of Phasis (1950.10.24 – death 1953.08.28)
uncanonical, i.e. without papal mandate : Shi Ming-liang (石明良) (1963 – ?), died 1978
without papal mandate : Simon Liu Zong-yu (劉宗漁) (1981 – 1992.09.30), died 1992
 Peter Luo Bei-zhan (駱北瞻) (1993 – death 2001.03.26).

See also 
 Catholic Church in Sichuan
 Anglican Diocese of Szechwan
 List of Catholic dioceses in China

References

Sources and external links 
 GCatholic.org - data for all sections except statistics
 Catholic Hierarchy - statistics

Attribution
 

Roman Catholic dioceses and prelatures established in the 19th century
Chongqing
Religious organizations established in 1856
Organizations based in Chongqing
1856 establishments in China
Christianity in Chongqing